San Sebastiano al Vesuvio is a comune in the Metropolitan City of Naples, located on the western slopes of Mount Vesuvius. Its elevation means that it is often a few degrees cooler than the neighbouring metropolis of Naples.

In 1944 it was struck by the eruption of Mount Vesuvius during the Allies' occupation of southern Italy, but has since been rebuilt. The main attraction is the church of San Sebastiano Martire from the 16th century.

References 

Cities and towns in Campania
Mount Vesuvius